Baryssinus bilineatus is a species of longhorn beetle in the family Cerambycidae. It was described by Henry Walter Bates in 1864.

References

Baryssinus
Beetles described in 1864